Copernicia yarey is a palm which is endemic to Cuba.

References

yarey
Trees of Cuba
Taxa named by Max Burret